Diógenes Luna Martínez (born May 1, 1977) is a boxer from Cuba, who won the bronze medal in the light welterweight division (– 63.5 kg) at the 2000 Summer Olympics in Sydney, Australia. In the semifinals he was defeated by eventual runner-up Ricardo Williams from the United States. A year later he won the world title at the 2001 World Amateur Boxing Championships in Belfast, Northern Ireland.

Results 
1998 Central American and Caribbean Games
1st round bye
Defeated Kevin Placide (Trinidad) RSC-3
Defeated Julio Jean (Haiti) RSC-1
Defeated José Luis Zertuche (Mexico) +26:26

1999 Pan American Games
1st round bye
Defeated Gibeon Gonzalez (Virgin Islands) RSC-1
Lost to Victor Hugo Castro (Argentina) 3:6

2000 Olympic Games
1st round bye
Defeated Willy Blain (France) 25:14
Defeated Saleh Abdelbary Maksoud (Egypt) RSC-2
Lost to Ricardo Williams, Jr. (United States) 41:42

References
 Cuba en Juegos Olímpicos (1896-2004): Medallistas en los Juegos. Granma official website. Retrieved September 21, 2012.
 databaseOlympics.com
 

1977 births
Living people
Light-welterweight boxers
Boxers at the 1999 Pan American Games
Boxers at the 2000 Summer Olympics
Olympic boxers of Cuba
Olympic bronze medalists for Cuba
Olympic medalists in boxing
Cuban male boxers
AIBA World Boxing Championships medalists
Medalists at the 2000 Summer Olympics
Pan American Games bronze medalists for Cuba
Pan American Games medalists in boxing
Central American and Caribbean Games gold medalists for Cuba
Competitors at the 1998 Central American and Caribbean Games
Central American and Caribbean Games medalists in boxing
Medalists at the 1999 Pan American Games
20th-century Cuban people